The Mayor of Gazipur City is the chief executive of the Gazipur City Corporation in Bangladesh. The Mayor's office administers all city services, public property, most public agencies, and enforces all city and state laws within Gazipur City.

The Mayor's office is located in Nagar Bhaban; it has jurisdiction over all 57 wards of Gazipur City.

List of officeholders 
Political parties

Status

Elections

Election Result 2018

Election Result 2013

References

Gazipur
Mayors of places in Bangladesh
People from Gazipur District
Gazipur City Corporation
Mayors of Gazipur